Grover Hot Springs State Park is a state park of California, United States, containing natural hot springs on the eastern side of the Sierra Nevada.  Park amenities include a swimming pool complex fed by the hot springs, as well as a campground, picnic area, and hiking trails.  The  park was established in 1959.

Name
Named for Alvin M Grover on whose homestead the springs are situated and was county assessor.

Geography
Vegetation consists mainly of pine forest, sagebrush, and open meadows. The park is open all year allowing visitors to experience a variety of weather conditions, from major blizzards to dry days, from warm clear nights to intense, blasting thunderstorms. Winds of great speed coming off the mountains are capable of whipping through the park causing damage during any month of the year.

Hot springs and pools
The mineral deposits on the bottom of the pool cause refracted light to lose certain wavelengths; a distinct yellow-green hue is noticeable. These mineral deposits are laid down on the bottom by an oxidation reaction between the mineral salts in the water and the bromine used as a sanitizing agent. The pool complex is generally open every day (except Wednesday) year round. The pools close during nearby thunderstorms due to the possibility of lightning striking the water.

Technical data

See also
List of California state parks

References

External links 

Grover Hot Springs State Park

1959 establishments in California
Campgrounds in California
Hot springs of California
Parks in Alpine County, California
Protected areas established in 1959
Protected areas of the Sierra Nevada (United States)
State parks of California
Bodies of water of Alpine County, California